Vivian Kong Man Wai (born 8 February 1994) is a Hong Kong left-handed épée fencer, two-time individual Asian champion, and two-time Olympian.

Career 

Kong competed in the 2016 Rio de Janeiro Olympic Games and the 2020 Tokyo Olympic Games. She became the first fencer from Hong Kong to win a World Cup title when she won the FIE Women's Épée World Cup in Havana, Cuba in January of 2019.

She won one of the bronze medals in the women's épée event at the 2022 World Fencing Championships held in Cairo, Egypt.

Medal record

World Championship

Asian Championship

Grand Prix

World Cup

References

External links
 

1994 births
Living people
Canadian emigrants to Hong Kong
Canadian people of Hong Kong descent
Hong Kong female épée fencers
Fencers at the 2016 Summer Olympics
Fencers at the 2020 Summer Olympics
Olympic fencers of Hong Kong
Fencers at the 2014 Asian Games
Fencers at the 2018 Asian Games
Asian Games bronze medalists for Hong Kong
Asian Games medalists in fencing
Medalists at the 2014 Asian Games
Medalists at the 2018 Asian Games
World Fencing Championships medalists